Cautley is a surname. Notable people with the surname include:

Baron Cautley of Lindfield in the County of Sussex, a title in the Peerage of the United Kingdom
Henry Cautley, 1st Baron Cautley KC (1863–1946), British barrister, judge and Conservative politician
Marjorie Sewell Cautley (1891–1954), American landscape architect
Proby Cautley KCB (1802–1871), English engineer and palaeontologist
Thomas Cautley Newby (1797–1882), English publisher and printer based in London
William Cautley (died 1864), New Zealand politician

See also
Cautley Spout, England's highest waterfall above ground